All the Way is an album by vocalist Etta Jones featuring songs by lyricist Sammy Cahn which was recorded in 1999 and released on the HighNote label.

Reception
In JazzTimes Nancy Ann Lee noted "An instantly recognizable stylist, Etta Jones sings a heartfelt 10-tune Sammy Cahn tribute, lending drawling, note-bending phrasing to chestnuts such as "It's Magic," “I Should Care," “I'll Walk Alone", "All the Way" and more" and called it "Jones’ classiest, recent-best album".

Track listing 
 "It's Magic" (Jule Styne, Sammy Cahn) – 5:41
 "Second Time Around" (Jimmy Van Heusen, Cahn) – 6:10
 "Until the Real Thing Comes Along" (Saul Chaplin, L.E. Freeman, Alberta Nichols, Mann Holiner, Cahn) – 6:09
 "I Should Care" (Axel Stordahl, Paul Weston, Cahn) – 5:23
 "I'll Walk Alone" (Styne, Cahn) – 6:18
 "Saturday Night (Is the Loneliest Night of the Week)" (Styne, Cahn) – 3:49
 "All the Way" (Van Heusen, Cahn) – 5:44
 "It's You or No One" (Styne, Cahn) – 5:43
 "It's Been a Long, Long Time" (Styne, Cahn) – 5:27
 "Put 'em in a Box, Tie 'em with a Ribbon, and Throw 'em in the Deep Blue Sea" (Styne, Cahn) – 4:52

Personnel 
Etta Jones – vocals
Norman Simmons – piano
John Webber – bass
Kenny Washington – drums
Houston Person – tenor saxophone (tracks 2, 4 & 5–8)
Steve Turre – trombone (tracks 4, 6 & 10)
Tom Aalfs – violin (tracks 1, 8 & 10)
Russell Malone – guitar (tracks 1–5, 8 & 9)

References 

Etta Jones albums
1999 albums
HighNote Records albums
Tribute albums